Karl Burns (born ,1958 in Manchester, England) is a British musician best known as the drummer for the Fall, featuring in many incarnations of the band between 1977 and 1998.

Although several musicians have rejoined the Fall having previously left or been fired, Burns was reportedly rehired a record nine times. He eventually left for good, alongside longtime bassist Steve Hanley, following an on-stage altercation with group leader Mark E. Smith in New York in April 1998.

Musical career 
Burns was the Fall's first permanent drummer, joining them in time for their second gig.  Burns is heard on the group's first two singles and their first studio album Live at the Witch Trials.

Burns left in early 1979, joining the Teardrops, with Steve Garvey of Buzzcocks, with whom he formed a brief and parallel project, Bok Bok, and remained in the band until 1981, when they broke up. Burns also played with Elti Fits and, briefly, with John Lydon's Public Image Limited (PIL) in September 1979, but left because he did not get along with other members, including guitarist Keith Levene and bass guitarist Jah Wobble, the latter of whom was long alleged to have attempted to set Burns on fire, although Wobble denied this in 2007.

Burns rejoined the Fall in 1981, initially as a temporary replacement for Paul Hanley who was refused a visa for a U.S. tour due to being too young. Recordings from this tour were released as A Part of America Therein, 1981. Upon the group's return to the UK, Smith invited Burns to stay on and The Fall appeared with two drummers until Paul Hanley's departure in late 1984; Burns would also sometimes play a second guitar or bass guitar during that period. His second tenure in the Fall coincided with a string of critically acclaimed releases, including Hex Enduction Hour and This Nation's Saving Grace. However, he left the band in early 1986 after an argument with Smith, to be replaced by Simon Wolstencroft. After his exit, Burns briefly collaborated with former bandmate Martin Bramah under the name Thirst, and eventually quit music for several years, becoming a motorcycle courier.

Burns made an unexpected return to the Fall in 1993 to play alongside Wolstencroft in a second two-drummer line-up until the latter left in 1997. He also contributed guitar, keyboards and occasional vocals during this period. However, he was absent from several tours, leaving and returning regularly until his final departure.

According to the 2008 book The Fallen by Dave Simpson, Burns's repeated departures from the Fall were due primarily to his open resistance to Mark E. Smith's unorthodox leadership. To coax musicians into performing as he prefers, Smith was notorious for using a variety of "moulding" methods such as insults, silent treatment, and jostling musicians onstage. Many of Burns's former Fall bandmates reported that he was most likely to retaliate against Smith, physically if Burns deemed it necessary. Burns's clashes with Smith was perhaps most obvious at the notorious New York City concert in 1998 where Burns attacked Smith after the vocalist repeatedly and deliberately knocked one of Burns's cymbal stands to the floor. Simpson also quotes ex-Fall keyboardist Simon Rogers describing Burns as a "brilliant" drummer whose somewhat erratic temperament made him unlikely to fit in more conventional bands.

Current whereabouts 
Burns was one of few ex-members of the Fall whom Dave Simpson was not able to find for his article "Excuse Me, Weren't You in the Fall?" (2006) and his book The Fallen (2008). Several ex-members feared that Burns was dead, although a rumour circulated that he lived in "the hills" in Rossendale. In an interview with The Stool Pigeon (issue 10, February 2007), Mark E. Smith stated that he had recently met Burns' mother; she confirmed that he was indeed alive, advising Smith that he "lives on a farm in the hills somewhere". After the publication of The Fallen, Burns contacted Simpson by e-mail, requesting a copy of the book to a Rossendale address which he stressed was not his residence. Burns had already spoken to his former bandmate, Steve Hanley, by telephone, and told him that he was married and working. It has since been said that several of his bandmates knew where Burns was the whole time, and that he simply did not want to be involved with the book.

References 

British male drummers
English punk rock drummers
English record producers
British post-punk musicians
The Fall (band) members
Public Image Ltd members
1958 births
Living people
Musicians from Manchester